The Legion of Doom is a group of DC Comics supervillains

Legion of Doom may also refer to:
Legion of Doom (hacking), a hacker group
The Legion of Doom (mash up group), a music production team and electronica group

Film and television
 A vigilante group whose activities were dramatized in the 1986 film, Brotherhood of Justice
 "The Legion of Doom" (Legends of Tomorrow), an episode of Legends of Tomorrow

Sport
Legion of Doom (ice hockey), nickname for a line of Philadelphia Flyers ice hockey players
The Road Warriors, professional wrestling tag team known as Legion of Doom in the WWF/WWE and as a nickname in other promotions
 The Legion Of Doom, a professional wrestling stable managed by Paul Ellering circa 1983, of which the Road Warriors were two (but not the only) members.